Rupert Gomes (born 10 April 1950) is a former cricket player born at Georgetown, Guyana. He played first-class and List A cricket for Guyana up to 1980–81. Five years later he played for the Netherlands in the ICC Trophy tournaments of 1986 and 1990. In the latter tournament he scored 169 not out against Israel, the highest score for a Netherlands player in the ICC Trophy.

References

Dutch cricketers
Guyanese cricketers
Demerara cricketers
Guyana cricketers
1950 births
Living people
Guyanese emigrants to the Netherlands
Sportspeople from Georgetown, Guyana